is the first single by Japanese idol girl group NGT48. It was released on April 12, 2017. It reached number-one on the weekly Oricon Singles Chart with 160,271 copies sold. It was also number-one on the Billboard Japan Hot 100.

Track listing

Chart performance

Oricon

Billboard Japan

References

2017 singles
2017 songs
J-pop songs
Japanese-language songs
NGT48 songs
Oricon Weekly number-one singles
Billboard Japan Hot 100 number-one singles
Ariola Japan singles
Song articles with missing songwriters